Billboard Argentina is an Argentine entertainment media brand owned by Sociedad de Editores ABC1. It publishes pieces involving interviews, analysis of industry trends, shows and releases reviews, news, video, opinion, events, style, and the Billboard Argentina Hot 100 chart, which was launched in October 2018. Billboard Argentina was founded in 2013.

Argentina Hot 100

See also
Billboard charts
Billboard (magazine)
Billboard Brasil
Billboard Japan

References

External links
 

2013 establishments in Argentina
Magazines published in Buenos Aires
Monthly magazines published in Argentina
 
Magazines established in 2013
Magazines about the media
Spanish-language magazines